Micropentila adelgunda, the large dots, is a butterfly in the family Lycaenidae. It is found in Ghana, Nigeria, Cameroon and possibly Gabon and the Democratic Republic of the Congo (Kinshasa). The habitat consists of primary forests.

References

Butterflies described in 1892
Poritiinae
Butterflies of Africa